Mirabello is a frazione of the  comune (municipality) of Terre del Reno in the Province of Ferrara in the Italian region of Emilia-Romagna, located about  north of Bologna and about  west of Ferrara.

It was a separate comune until 1 January 2017

References

Cities and towns in Emilia-Romagna